Remmert is a surname and given name. Notable people with the surname include:

 Birgit Remmert (born 1966), German mezzo-soprano
 Dennis Remmert (1938–2020), American football player
 Martha Remmert (1853–1941), German classical pianist, music educator, conductor and music writer
 Reinhold Remmert (1930–2016), German mathematician
 Remmert Wielinga (born 1978), Dutch road bicycle racer

See also
 Emmert